Trians is a small village under the administration of Concello of Negreira, in the autonomous community of Galicia, Spain.

Municipalities in the Province of A Coruña